Local elections were held in Trust Territory of Somaliland in October 1958. The Somali Youth League won 416 of the 663 seats up for election.

Results

References

Italian Somaliland local elections
Italian Somaliland
1958
Italian Somaliland local elections